Julius August Döpfner (26 August 1913 – 24 July 1976) was a German Cardinal of the Roman Catholic Church who served as Archbishop of Munich and Freising from 1961 until his death, and was elevated to the cardinalate in 1958.

Biography

Early life and ordination
Julius Döpfner was born in Hausen (today a part of Bad Kissingen) to Julius Matthäus and Maria Döpfner. He was baptised two days later, on 28 August. Döpfner had a sister, Maria, and two brothers, Paul and Otto. Entering the Augustinian-run gymnasium at Münnerstadt in 1924, he later attended the Seminary of Würzburg and the Pontifical German-Hungarian College in Rome. Döpfner was ordained to the priesthood by Archbishop Luigi Traglia on 29 October 1939, and then finished his studies at the Pontifical Gregorian University, from where he obtained a doctorate in theology in 1941, writing his dissertation on Cardinal John Henry Newman. He worked as a chaplain in Großwallstadt until 1944.

Bishop
On 11 August 1948, Döpfner was appointed Bishop of Würzburg by Pope Pius XII. He received his episcopal consecration on the following 14 October from Archbishop Joseph Kolb, with Bishops Joseph Schröffer and Arthur Landgraf serving as co-consecrators. The consecration took place in the Neumünster Collegiate church, Würzburg, due to the fact that Würzburg Cathedral was unusable due to the Bombing of Würzburg in World War II.

He was named Bishop of Berlin on 15 January 1957, and became the youngest member of the College of Cardinals when he was created Cardinal-Priest of Santa Maria della Scala (pro hac vice) by Pope John XXIII in the Consistory of 15 December 1958.

Promoted to Archbishop of Munich and Freising on 3 July 1961, Döpfner participated in the Second Vatican Council (1962–1965), and sat on its Board of Presidency. Along with Cardinal Raúl Silva Henríquez, he assisted Cardinal Léon-Etienne Duval in delivering one of the closing messages of the Council on 8 December 1965.

The German prelate was one of the cardinal electors in the 1963 papal conclave, which selected Pope Paul VI.

From 1965 to 1976, Döpfner was Chairman of the Conference of the German Bishops and thus the spokesman of the Catholic Church in Germany. He was often described as papabile, but he died at age 62 in the archiepiscopal residence of Munich.

Views

Church reform
The Cardinal, who was considered liberal in his positions, criticised the Church's "antiquated forms" and its "resisting ideas, forms and possibilities to which perhaps the future belongs, and we often consider as impossible that which will finally manifest itself as a legitimate form of Christianity".

Birth control
He was deeply involved with the question of birth control, serving as co-deputy on the Vatican's commission to study the topics of marriage, family, and regulation of birth.

Ecumenism
He also supported ecumenism.

References

External links

Cardinals of the Holy Roman Church profile
 

1913 births
1976 deaths
People from Bad Kissingen
20th-century German cardinals
Roman Catholic archbishops of Munich and Freising
Participants in the Second Vatican Council
Burials at Munich Frauenkirche
Cardinals created by Pope John XXIII
Grand Crosses 1st class of the Order of Merit of the Federal Republic of Germany
20th-century Roman Catholic bishops in Germany
German Roman Catholic archbishops